Matt Browne (born 15 April 1983) is an American motorcycle speedway rider who was a member of United States team at 2007 Speedway World Cup but he did not start as reserve.

Career details 
 Team World Championship (Speedway World Team Cup and Speedway World Cup)
 2007 - 7th place (did not start as reserve)

See also 
 United States national speedway team
 Speedway World Cup

References 

1983 births
American speedway riders
Living people